The 1936 World Table Tennis Championships were held in Prague from March 12 to March 18, 1936.

The championships were criticised for the bad management and poor tables. The Lucerna Palace arena (a 4,000-seat, underground concert hall) conditions were also described as chaos.

Medalists

Team

Individual

References

External links
ITTF Museum

 
World Table Tennis Championships
World Table Tennis Championships
World Table Tennis Championships
Table tennis in Czechoslovakia
International sports competitions hosted by Czechoslovakia
March 1936 sports events
Sports competitions in Prague
1930s in Prague